Antelope Creek is a tributary of Little Butte Creek in the U.S. state of Oregon.

The creek passes under Oregon Route 62 (Crater Lake Highway) between Eagle Point and White City, slightly before entering Little Butte Creek. Named tributaries of Antelope Creek from source to mouth are Yankee Creek, Quarter Branch, and Dry Creek.

Covered bridge
Antelope Creek Bridge, a covered bridge, formerly carried "the old Medford – Crater Lake Road" south of Eagle Point. In 1987, the bridge, having been replaced by a modern structure, was moved to an Eagle Point park. Used as a pedestrian bridge, it spans Little Butte Creek instead of Antelope Creek.

See also
 List of rivers of Oregon

References

Rivers of Jackson County, Oregon
Rivers of Oregon